Kaʻiminaʻauao (November 7, 1845 – November 10, 1848) was a Hawaiian high chiefess who was given in adoption to Queen Kalama and King Kamehameha III. She died of the measles at the age of three, during an epidemic of measles, whooping cough and influenza that killed more than 10,000 Native Hawaiians. Her elder brother and sister became King Kalākaua (who reigned from 1874 to 1891), and Queen Liliʻuokalani (who reigned as Hawaii's last monarch from 1891 to 1893).

Name 
Her name has been traditionally spelled Kaiminaauao or Kaʻiminaʻauao with the two ʻokina, which are phonemic glottal stop, as it is used in many Polynesian languages. It is alternatively spelled as Kaiminiaauao. Her name means "the search for knowledge" in the Hawaiian language. According to Hawaiian linguist Mary Kawena Pukui, ʻimi naʻau ao means "to seek knowledge or education; ambitious to learn; one seeking education or learning, research, learning".

Family 

Kaʻiminaʻauao was born on November 7, 1845. Born into the aliʻi class of Hawaiian nobility, her father High Chief Caesar Kapaʻakea and mother High Chiefess Analea Keohokālole were advisors to the reigning king Kamehameha III. Her mother was the daughter of ʻAikanaka and Kamaʻeokalani while her father was the son of Kamanawa II (half-brother of ʻAikanaka) and Kamokuiki. From her parents, she descended from Keaweaheulu and Kameʻeiamoku, the royal counselors of Kamehameha I during his conquest of the Kingdom of Hawaii. Kameʻeiamoku, the grandfather of both her mother and father, was one of the royal twins alongside Kamanawa depicted on the Hawaiian coat of arms. Kaʻiminaʻauao's family were collateral relations of the House of Kamehameha. Another relative of the family was the High Chiefess Kapiʻolani who plucked the sacred ʻōhelo berries and openly defied the goddess Pele as a dramatic demonstration of her new faith in Christianity.

The fifth child and third daughter of a large family, her sibling included James Kaliokalani, David Kalākaua (who reigned as king from 1874 to 1891), Lydia Kamakaʻeha (who reigned as Hawaii's last monarch, Queen Liliʻuokalani from 1891 to 1893), Anna Kaʻiulani, Miriam Likelike, and William Pitt Leleiohoku II. All her siblings were given away in hānai to other family members and friends. The Hawaiian custom of hānai is an informal form of adoption between extended families practiced by Hawaiian royals and commoners alike. She was adopted by Queen Kalama, the wife of King Kamehameha III. The royal couple were childless at the time because two sons born to Kalama (both named Keaweaweʻulaokalani) had died during infancy. Kamehameha III had previously adopted his half-sister Kīnaʻu's son Alexander Liholiho (the future Kamehameha IV) as his heir and successor. Contemporary English sources referred to Kaʻiminaʻauao as the ward of the queen.

Death and funeral 
The measles epidemic of 1848-49 was brought to Hilo by an American warship. During this short period, a combination of measles and whooping cough and influenza epidemics killed 10,000 people, mostly Native Hawaiians. Among the high chiefs who died were Moses Kekūāiwa (son of Kīnaʻu and Kekūanāoʻa), William Pitt Leleiohoku I (husband of Ruth Keʻelikōlani) and the three-year-old Kaʻiminaʻauao, who died on November 10, 1848. The bodies of the deceased were embalmed with alcohol in lead coffins and placed inside wooden coffins.

Initially buried in the Pohukaina Tomb, located on grounds of ʻIolani Palace, her remains were left behind when the coffins of other royals were moved to the newly constructed Royal Mausoleum at Mauna ʻAla in the Nuʻuanu Valley in 1865. This changed after the accession of her brother as king. On the evening of November 30, 1875, her remains and the remains of her parents, buried at the cemetery of Kawaiahaʻo Church, were transported to the Royal Mausoleum followed by torchlight under a military escort led by John Owen Dominis. 
In a ceremony officiated by her sister Liliʻuokalani on June 24, 1910, her remains, and those of her family, were transferred for a final time to the underground Kalākaua Crypt after the main mausoleum building had been converted into a chapel.

Kaʻiminaʻauao's three elder siblings were educated at the Chiefs' Children's School (later renamed the Royal School) founded in 1839 by the American missionary couple Amos Starr Cooke and Juliette Montague Cooke to provide a Western-style education to the Hawaiian royal children. The children at the school were chosen by Kamehameha III to be eligible for the throne of the Kingdom of Hawaii. It was intended that Kaʻiminaʻauao would join the school. However, her early death and the death of other aliʻi children in the epidemic prevented the addition of new scholars to the school. This deficit of scholars would lead to the closure of the school in 1850. Juliette Montague Cooke wrote: "A little girl, sister of three of our scholars, adopted by the Queen, and who was expecting to enter our family, died on 10th inst. aged three years and two days."

Ancestry

References

Bibliography 

1845 births
1848 deaths
Royalty of the Hawaiian Kingdom
House of Kalākaua
Infectious disease deaths in Hawaii
Burials at the Royal Mausoleum (Mauna ʻAla)
Hawaiian adoptees (hānai)
Deaths from measles
Royalty who died as children